Mihălășeni is a commune in Botoșani County, Western Moldavia, Romania. It is composed of seven villages: Caraiman, Mihălășeni, Năstase, Negrești, Păun, Sărata and Slobozia Silișcani.

References

Communes in Botoșani County
Localities in Western Moldavia